Eddie Perkins (March 3, 1937 – May 10, 2012) was an American light welterweight boxer. He compiled an amateur boxing record of 26–10.

Professional career
Born in Clarksdale, Mississippi, Perkins turned professional in 1956. He was managed by Johnny Coulon and captured the Lineal and WBA light welterweight titles with a decision win over Duilio Loi in 1962, but lost the belt in a rematch later that year. In 1963 he then captured the Lineal, WBA and World Boxing Council light welterweight titles with a decision win over Roberto Cruz. He defended the belt twice before losing it to Carlos Morocho Hernandez in 1965.  He never challenged for a major title again, and retired in 1975. His record was 74-20-3 with 21 knockouts.

Death
Perkins, who suffered from dementia and diabetes, died on May 10, 2012.

Honors
Perkins was elected into the World Boxing Hall of Fame in 2006 and the International Boxing Hall of Fame in 2008.

Professional boxing record

See also
List of world light-welterweight boxing champions

References

External links

Eddie Perkins - CBZ Profile

 

 

|-

|-

1937 births
2012 deaths
American male boxers
Boxers from Mississippi
Sportspeople from Clarksdale, Mississippi
International Boxing Hall of Fame inductees
African-American boxers
Welterweight boxers
World light-welterweight boxing champions
World Boxing Association champions
World Boxing Council champions
The Ring (magazine) champions